The 2017–18 FAW Welsh Cup was the 131st season of the annual knockout tournament for competitive football teams in Wales.

The winners Connah's Quay Nomads qualified for the 2018–19 UEFA Europa League preliminary round.

First qualifying round
The draw for the first qualifying round was held on 12 July 2017. The draw was regionalized into six sections: South East, South Central, South West, Central, North West and North East. All matches were played on 19 August 2017.

South East region

|}

South Central region

The Aber Valley/Cardiff Corinthians and Merthyr Saints/Tiger Bay ties had been reversed.
 

|}

South West region

 

|}

Central region

 

|}

North East region

 

|}

North West region

 

|}

Second qualifying round
The draw for the second qualifying round was held on 21 August 2017. The draw was regionalized into five sections: South East, South West, Central, North West and North East. Matches were played on 9 September 2017 with the exception of Mynydd Llandygai/Mochdre Sports which was played on 23 September 2017 . Treharris Athletic Western were disqualified for fielding an ineligible player and Llanrumney United replaced them.

South East region

|}

South West region

 

|}

Central region

 

|}

North East region

The Mold Alexandra/Acton, Penycae/Llay Welfare and Llanuwchllyn/Chirk ties were reversed from the original draw.
 

|}

North West region

Glantraeth FC were due to play Prestatyn Sports but withdrew.

 

|}

First round
The draw for the first round was held on 11 September 2017.

Results:

|-
!colspan="3" align="center"|6 October

|-
!colspan="3" align="center"|7 October

|}

Second round
The draw for the second round was held on 8 October 2017.

Results:

|-
!colspan="3" align="center"|4 November

|}

Third round
The draw for the third round was held on 6 November 2017.

Results:

|-
!colspan="3" align="center"|1 December

|-
!colspan="3" align="center"|2 December

|-
!colspan="3" align="center"|3 December

|}

Fourth round
The draw for the fourth round was held on 4 December 2017.

Results:

|-
!colspan="3" align="center"|26 January

|-
!colspan="3" align="center"|27 January

|}

Quarter-finals
The draw for the quarter-finals was held on 29 January 2018.

Results:

|-
!colspan="3" align="center"|4 March

|-
!colspan="3" align="center"|6 March

|}

Semi-finals
The draw for the semi-finals was held on 5 March 2018. The matches were played at neutral venues.

Results:

|-
!colspan="3" align="center"|7/8 April

|}

Final
The final was played on 6 May 2018.

|-
!colspan="3" align="center"|6 May

|}

References

Welsh Cup seasons
Wales
Cup